Euseius myrobalanus is a species of mite in the family Phytoseiidae.

References

myrobalanus
Articles created by Qbugbot
Animals described in 1988